In enzymology, an acridone synthase is an enzyme that catalyzes the chemical reaction

3 malonyl-CoA + N-methylanthraniloyl-CoA  4 CoA + 1,3-dihydroxy-N-methylacridone + 3 CO2

Thus, the two substrates of this enzyme are malonyl-CoA and N-methylanthraniloyl-CoA, whereas its 3 products are CoA, 1,3-dihydroxy-N-methylacridone, and CO2.

This enzyme belongs to the family of transferases, specifically those acyltransferases transferring groups other than aminoacyl groups.  The systematic name of this enzyme class is malonyl-CoA:N-methylanthraniloyl-CoA malonyltransferase (cyclizing). This enzyme participates in acridone alkaloid biosynthesis.

References

 
 
 
 

EC 2.3.1
Enzymes of unknown structure